Madhuranthaganallur is a village located in the Keerapalayam panchayath, Chidambaram taluk, Cuddalore district in the Indian state of Tamil Nadu.

It is located 49 km to the south of District headquarters Cuddalore, 8 km from Keerapalayam, 230 km from state capital Chennai.

Chidambaram, Neyveli, Cuddalore, Sirkali, Virudhachalam are the nearby cities to Madhuranthaganallur.

Nearby Railway Stations is Chidambaram- 14 km .
Nearby Airports Chennai Airport- 207 km, Trichy Airport - 170 km .

List of streets 

 Agrahaaram Street
 Sivan koil Street
 Reddiyar Mettu Street
 East Street
 West Street
 North Street
 South Street
 Main Road
 New Street
 Kuttakaran Street
 Manthakarai Street
 Periya Street ( North)
 Periya Street ( South)
 Small Street
 Puram Harijana Street

Nearby schools 
 Panchayath Union Middle School Madhuranthaganallur.
 Aadi dravidar Government Higher Secondary School Madhuranthaganallur.
 Thiruvalluvar Higher Secondary School Orathur - 3 km.
 DGM Higher Secondary School Sethiathope - 9 km.
 RCTHSS, Ramakrishna, Nandanar, Pachayapa, Nirmala matric, Venus Matric, Kamaraj Matric Higher Secondary schools in Chidambaram - 11 km.

Nearby university and colleges 
 Annamalai University in Chidambaram - 11 km.
 Sri Ragavendra Arts and Science College Keezhmoongiladi - 15 km.
 MRK Institute of Technology - Kattumannarkoil - 20 km.

Tourist and historic places to visit 
 periya nayagi temple in madhuranthaganallur
 sivan temple in madhuranthaganallur
 perumal temple in madhuranthaganallur
 Sri Ragavendra Swami birthplace in Buvangiri - 7 km.
 Nataraja Temple in Chidambaram - 11 km.
 Pichavaram Mangrove Forest - 20 km.
 Cuddalore Silver Beach - 57 km.
 Velankanni Temple - 125 km.

References

Villages in Cuddalore district